The first Pan American Games in Buenos Aires in 1951 included men's freestyle wrestling competitions in various weight categories. Events were held between 25 February  and 3 March.

Medal summary

Medal table

References
  .
 
 

1951
Events at the 1951 Pan American Games
Pan American Games
1951 Pan American Games